Isaiah Kopinsky (b ? in Galicia region – 5 October 1640) was the Metropolitan of Kiev, Galicia and all Ruthenia in the Ecumenical Patriarchate of Constantinople in the Eastern Orthodox Church from 1631 to 1632. He studied at the Lviv Dormition Brotherhood School and entered a monastery as a youth. Eventually he became the hegumen of the Kyiv Epiphany Brotherhood Monastery and the Mezhyhiria Transfiguration Monastery and one of the founders of the Kyiv Epiphany Brotherhood School.

In 1620, when the Orthodox hierarchy was renewed by Patriarch Theophanes III of Jerusalem, Isaiah was consecrated bishop of Peremyshl and Sambir; however, he was not permitted to assume his post by the Polish king, and he was instead named bishop of Chernihiv and Smolensk. He was well known as an organizer of monasteries; through his efforts the Mgarsky Monastery, the Hustynia Trinity Monastery, and other monasteries were founded. In 1631 he succeeded Metropolitan Yov Boretsky as Kyivan metropolitan.

Isaiah was a conservative and a decided foe of Catholicism and the Uniate church. He was also pro-Muscovite and favoured conciliation with the tsar and the Moscow metropolitan. After the legalization of the Orthodox hierarchy by Poland in 1632 and the election of Petro Mohyla as metropolitan of Kyiv, Isaiah was forced by the latter to relinquish his post. He became the supervisor of the Kyiv St. Michael's Golden-Domed Monastery in 1633, and lobbied unsuccessfully to regain his title from Mohyla, supported by many monasteries and Cossacks.

In 1635 he moved to Polisia, and in 1638 back to Kyiv, where he probably died.

Notelist

References 
Note: The title is also known as the Metropolis of Kiev, Halych and all Rus' or Metropolis of Kyiv, Halychyna, and All-Rus'. The name "Galicia" is a Latinized form of Halych, one of several regional principalities of the medieval Kievan Rus'.

 Kopynsky, Isaia at the Encyclopedia of Ukraine

Metropolitans of Kiev, Galicia and all Rus' (1620-1686)
Eastern Orthodox bishops of Smolensk
Bishops of Przemyśl
1640 deaths
Year of birth unknown
People from Parczew County
People from Ruthenian Voivodeship
Hegumens
Constantinople Exarchs of Ukraine
Eastern Orthodox monks from Ukraine